Elefantes de Cienfuegos (English: Cienfuegos Elephants) is a baseball team in the Cuban National Series. Based in the southern city of Cienfuegos, the Elefantes had their best season in their second year of existence, finishing fourth in the National Series. The team achieved its best result in the 2009–10 season finishing third.

There were two pitchers on the Cuba national baseball team at the 2006 World Baseball Classic: Adiel Palma and Yosvany Pérez.

Roster

National Series MVPs
1980 Pedro José Rodríguez
2011 José Dariel Abreu

Other notable players
 José Dariel Abreu
 Roberto Almarales
 Osvaldo Arias
 Erisbel Arruebarrena
 Norberto González (pitcher)
 Alex Guerrero
 Sixto Hernández
 Rolando Macías
 Yoan Moncada
 Antonio Muñoz
 Adiel Palma (pitcher)
 Yosvani Pérez (pitcher)
 Yasiel Puig
 Alexander Quintero (pitcher)
 Iván Rojas
 Remberto Rosell
 Yangency Socarrás

References

Baseball teams in Cuba
Cienfuegos
Baseball teams established in 1977
1977 establishments in Cuba